Bob Straub State Park is a  state park in Pacific City, Tillamook County, Oregon, United States. It is named for former Oregon Governor Robert W. Straub.  The park encompasses the Nestucca Sand Spit and is bordered by the Pacific Ocean to the west and Nestucca River to the east.

Services
Picnicking
Marine mammal watching
Wildlife watching
Fishing
Dunes
Beach access
Horseback Riding

References

External links
Bob Straub State Park

Parks in Tillamook County, Oregon
State parks of Oregon